The seventh season of Chicago Fire, an American drama television series from executive producer Dick Wolf and producers Derek Haas and Matt Olmstead, was ordered on May 9, 2018, by NBC. The season premiered on September 26, 2018, with a timeslot change from Thursday at 10:00 p.m. to Wednesday at 9:00 p.m. The season concluded on May 22, 2019, and contained 22 episodes.

Cast and characters

Main cast
 Jesse Spencer as Captain Matthew Casey, Truck 81
Taylor Kinney as Lieutenant Kelly Severide, Squad 3
 Kara Killmer as Paramedic in Charge Sylvie Brett, Ambulance 61
 David Eigenberg as Firefighter, later Lieutenant, Christopher Herrmann, Truck 81/Engine 51
 Yuri Sardarov as Firefighter Brian "Otis" Zvonecek, Truck 81
 Joe Minoso as Firefighter Joe Cruz, Squad 3
 Christian Stolte as Firefighter Randy "Mouch" McHolland, Truck 81
 Miranda Rae Mayo as Firefighter Stella Kidd, Truck 81
 Annie Ilonzeh as Paramedic Emily Foster, Ambulance 61
 Eamonn Walker as Chief Wallace Boden, Battalion 25

Recurring
 Randy Flagler as Firefighter Harold Capp, Rescue Squad 3
 Anthony Ferraris as Firefighter Tony Ferraris, Rescue Squad 3
 Daniel Kyri as Firefighter Candidate Darren Ritter, Engine 37/Engine 51
 Treat Williams as Chief Benjamin "Benny" Severide
 Gary Cole as Fire Commissioner Carl Grissom
 Kim Delaney as Jennifer Sheridan
 Brittany Curran as Katie Nolan
 Melissa Ponzio as Donna Robbins-Boden
 Robyn Coffin as Cindy Herrmann
 Jeff Lima as Leon Cruz 
 Steven Boyer as Assistant Deputy Commissioner Jerry Gorsch 
 Gordon Clapp as Chaplain Orlovsky
 Teddy Sears as Chaplain Kyle Sheffield
 Colin Egglesfield as Gordon Mayfield
 Jordan Belfi as Bradley Boyd
 Tye White as Tyler
 Kate Villanova as Naomi Graham
 Patrick Mulvey as Dr. Jack Garcia

Guest stars
 Monica Raymund as Paramedic Gabriela Dawson (Season 7 premiere)
 Rahm Emanuel as Mayor of Chicago (Season 7 finale)

Crossover characters
 Jason Beghe as Sergeant Henry "Hank" Voight
 Jon Seda as Detective Antonio Dawson
 Jesse Lee Soffer as Detective Jay Halstead
 Tracy Spiridakos as Detective Hailey Upton
 Marina Squerciati as Officer Kim Burgess
 LaRoyce Hawkins as Officer Kevin Atwater
 Amy Morton as Desk Sergeant Trudy Platt
 Nick Gehlfuss as Dr. Will Halstead
 Torrey DeVitto as Dr. Natalie Manning
 Colin Donnell as Dr. Connor Rhodes
 Brian Tee as Dr. Ethan Choi
 Marlyne Barrett as Maggie Lockwood
 Norma Kuhling as Dr. Ava Bekker
 S. Epatha Merkerson as Sharon Goodwin
 Louis Herthum as Pat Halstead
 Patti Murin as Dr. Nina Shore
 Lorena Diaz as Nurse Doris
 Casey Tutton as Nurse Monique Lawson

Episodes

Production

Cast changes
On May 15, 2018, longtime cast member Monica Raymund who plays Paramedic Gabriela Dawson, announced her departure from the series citing her desire to get on with the "next chapter in life." On September 21, 2018, NBC announced that newcomer Annie Ilonzeh would join the series as a regular playing Emily Foster replacing Raymund on Ambulance 61.

Ratings

Home media
The DVD release of season seven was released in Region 1 on August 27, 2019.

References

External links
 
 

2018 American television seasons
2019 American television seasons
Chicago Fire (TV series) seasons